Arthur Fleming Morrell (10 November 1788 – 13 September 1880) was British officer of the Royal Navy, an explorer, and Commandant of Ascension Island, who saw service spanning the end of the Napoleonic era and well into the Victorian era.

Early life 
Arthur Morrell was born in 1788 in Stoke Damerel, Devon, the second son of a Royal Navy lieutenant, John Morrell. His father had been an able seaman, rising to the warrant officer's rank of gunner by the time his sons entered the Royal Navy.

Career

Royal Navy 
Morrell's brother was John Arthur Morrell, who became a commander and served aboard  during an 1806 attack on Naples, then held by Napoleon's brother, Joseph Bonaparte. Morrell joined the Royal Navy at the age of about twelve or thirteen as a first class volunteer.

He then moved to the Caribbean on board , and was by now a master's mate. It was aboard Pique, a captured French ship formerly named Pallas, that he would take part in the blockade of Saint-Domingue in 1803, serving off Cape Francois. Morrell was part of the crew that brought Clorinde under a British flag to Jamaica. Pique later took part in an abortive attempt to capture Curaçao, which in 1804 had been retaken from Britain by a Dutch-French force.

After nine years in the Caribbean, Morrell found himself in the Mediterranean in a succession of ships including , from which he beheld the fall of Genoa in 1814, one of his last naval actions during the Napoleonic Wars. At the end of hostilities, Britain turned to Arctic exploration to employ its navy and to attempt to discover a shorter route to the resource-rich Pacific.

Arctic exploration 
In 1818, Morrell took part in a "perilous voyage of discovery" to Spitsbergen, in search of the Northwest Passage, in what was one of the earliest voyages of Arctic discovery. The voyage was unsuccessful, but Morrell would later be awarded the Arctic Medal, 1818–55. Captain David Buchan commanded HMS Dorothea, while Morrell served as first lieutenant.

As first lieutenant, Morrell kept a detailed log book which provided meteorological observations and navigational notes.  The expedition eventually failed to penetrate thick pack ice. The expedition returned to England without having achieved its goal.  It would be nearly 40 years before Arctic exploration would be recognized, and in 1856 the Arctic Medal was struck and issued retroactively for various polar voyages starting with 1818, the year of Buchan's expedition.

Ascension Island 
After a brief period commanding , which included successfully interdicting slave ships off the west coast of Africa, Morrell, now a commander, was in 1844 appointed Commandant of Ascension Island, an island in the Atlantic that held strategic value to Britain, due to its proximity to both Africa and South America.

He served as the island's 16th commandant for nearly three years, during which time the Royal Navy continued to engage the slave trade, and would have used the island as a base of operations and victualling stop.

Service history 
 1801: entered the Royal Navy as a first class volunteer aboard HMS Doris.
 1806: Promoted to master's mate aboard HMS Redbridge, 12
 1808: Served on board , 64, Captain William Pryce Cumby commanding
 1809: Confirmed to the rank of lieutenant.
 1814: Served on board , Captain John Lampeu Manley commanding
 1818: Appointed first lieutenant of HMHS Dorothea, under Commander David Buchan
 1821: First lieutenant aboard , 46, Captain Fleetwood Pellew
 1823–1841: On half-pay
 1844–1847: Commandant of Ascension Island
 1846: Commander of 
 1856: Promoted to captain and awarded the Arctic Medal (1818–55) on retirement from the Royal Navy

Marriage and family 
In 1820, Morrell married Elizabeth Reid, daughter of the "first pay clerk of wages" at Devonport, William Reid. Morrell was promoted to the rank of commander in 1821, but with peace, much of the Royal Navy was on half-pay.  In between periods at sea, it seems that Morrell and Elizabeth lived in or near Devonport.  But by 1830, the family had moved to Dinan, in France, where two of his sons were born, George Truman Morrell and another Arthur Morrell, both of whom would also serve in the Royal Navy. Elizabeth later died aged 61, on 29 September 1862, by which time the family had settled in Dartford, Erith, Kent. They had eight children together, of whom six would survive into adulthood.

 Anna Harriett Cumberland Pellew Morrell
 Lucy Elizabeth Haynes Morrell, who later married Scottish surgeon and botanist Edward George Irving
 Charles Walter Morrell
 Eliza Truman Morrell
 George Truman Morrell, explorer and later a commander in the Royal Navy
 Arthur Morrell, later a rear admiral in the Royal Navy
 Eliza Mary Anne Morrell
 Isabella Cunard Morrell

References 

1788 births
1880 deaths
Administrators of Ascension Island
English polar explorers
Explorers of the Arctic
Recipients of the Polar Medal
Royal Navy officers
Royal Navy personnel of the Napoleonic Wars
Military personnel from Plymouth, Devon